This is a list of the mountains in Seoul, South Korea.

See also
List of mountains in Korea
Lists of mountains by region

References

External links 
 Information about mountains in Seoul 
 Guide to mountains of Seoul at the Seoul Metropolitan Government official ste.

 
Mountains
Seoul
Mountains